Tanga Moreau is a Belgian model.  She has appeared on the cover of Vogue Paris and in the 1998 Sports Illustrated Swimsuit Issue.  She has done extensive print and runway work for many leading fashion companies, especially in the late 1990s.

Notes

External links

Belgian female models
Living people
Models from Brussels
Year of birth missing (living people)